Dryadaula advena is a moth of the family Tineidae. It was first described by Elwood Zimmerman in 1978. It has only been recorded from Hawaii, but might be an immigrant.

The length of the forewings is 4.5–5.5 mm.

External links

Dryadaulinae
Moths described in 1978
Insects of Hawaii